Holcopasites is a genus of cuckoo bees in the family Apidae. There are at least 20 described species in Holcopasites.

Species

References

Further reading

 
 
 

Nomadinae
Bee genera

Taxa named by William Harris Ashmead
Hymenoptera genera